The 2016–17 season is Sheffield Wednesday's fifth consecutive season in the Championship. Along with competing in the Championship, the club will also participate in the FA Cup and League Cup.

The season covers the period from 1 July 2016 to 30 June 2017.

Overview

August
Sheffield Wednesday started the 2016–17 season with a 1–0 win at home against recently relegated Aston Villa, thanks to a late Fernando Forestieri goal. The Owls' run in the League Cup did not last long as they lost 2–1 at Cambridge United after extra time, with Lucas João scoring for Sheffield Wednesday. In the next four league games The Owls managed just two points, with a 0–0 draw away to Norwich followed by a 3–1 away loss at Burton Albion, a 2–0 home loss to Leeds United and a 1–1 draw away to Brentford.

September
The Owls got off to a winning start in September with a 2–1 win over Wigan Athletic at Hillsborough. Steven Fletcher equalised for Sheffield Wednesday, scoring his first competitive goal for the club, whilst Fernando Forestieri scored the winning goal. Another home win followed with a 3–2 win over Bristol City thanks to Kieran Lee's 96th minute winning goal. The Owls' only loss in September came against Birmingham City losing 2–1 at St Andrews. This was followed by two successive victories, 2–1 at home against Nottingham Forest and 1–0 away against Blackburn Rovers.

October
The Owls lost their first game of October, a 2–1 loss at home against Brighton & Hove Albion. After the international break, Sheffield Wednesday got their first win of the month against Huddersfield Town thanks to Fernando Forestieri's 68th-minute penalty which was the only goal of the game. In the next game, a mid-week fixture, The Owls left the Cardiff City Stadium with a point after a 1–1 draw, with Daniel Pudil scoring the equalising goal. A few days later, Gary Hooper's 40th-minute goal was enough for Sheffield Wednesday to get all three points in their home game against Queens Park Rangers.

November
With only three games in November, The Owls managed four points out of a possible nine. Despite managing to equalise after just four minutes of going 1–0 down against Ipswich Town at home, Sheffield Wednesday eventually lost 2–1. The Owls drew 1–1 away against Fulham in their next game, despite leading for most of the game thanks to a goal from Fernando Forestieri after just 10 minutes. In their final game of November, Sheffield Wednesday beat Wolves 2–0 at Hillsborough, with Fernando Forestieri scoring a penalty and Kieran Lee scoring The Owls' second goal.

December
In a game which saw three players dismissed (Forestieri for The Owls and Beckford and Doyle for Preston North End), Sheffield Wednesday managed to take all three points with a 2–1 victory, with Fernando Forestieri and Steven Fletcher on the score sheet, the latter scoring from a penalty kick after on-loan winger Will Buckley was fouled in the penalty area by opposition goalkeeper Chris Maxwell. After a 2–1 away to Reading, Sheffield Wednesday won all of their next three games, with a 2–0 home win against local rivals Barnsley, a 1–0 home win against local rivals Rotherham United and a 1–0 away win against league table leaders Newcastle United, with team captain Glenn Loovens scoring the winning goal, his first for the club. In The Owls' final game of 2016, Adam Reach scored a late equaliser against Preston North End, his first goal for the club.

January
In Sheffield Wednesday's first match of 2017, the result was a 0–0 draw at Hillsborough against Wolves. This was followed by a 3–0 away defeat to Middlesbrough in the FA Cup, entering and exiting the tournament in the 3rd Round. In Sheffield Wednesday's next EFL Championship match, a goal each from Ross Wallace and Fernando Forestieri (both in the second half) gave The Owls a 2–0 victory against local rivals Huddersfield Town, extending Wednesday's unbeaten run in the league to six games. This run was ended after a 2–1 away loss to Brighton & Hove Albion, which was followed by a 2–2 draw away to Bristol City.

February
The Owls got February off to a winning start, with a 1–0 win at the DW Stadium against Wigan Athletic, thanks to a Ross Wallace goal. Two home games followed, with a 3–0 win over Birmingham City followed by a 2–1 win over Blackburn Rovers. In the following game, away to Nottingham Forest, Sheffield Wednesday extended their winning run to four games after a 2–1 win, with goals from Almen Abdi (his first for the club) and Fernando Forestieri for The Owls. Wednesday would then end February with back-to-back losses, 2–1 against Brentford and 1–0 at play-off rivals Leeds United, ending the Owls four match unbeaten run in acrimonious fashion. The Owls were in sixth place with twelve games to go at the end of this month, two points behind fifth placed Reading and five ahead of seventh placed Fulham, albeit a game ahead.

March
Sheffield Wednesday got March off to a winning start in style, with a 5– home win against Norwich City, with goals from Fernando Forestieri, Morgan Fox, Ross Wallace and a brace from January signing Jordan Rhodes. It was also the club's biggest win of the season, beating the previous month's 3–0 home win against Birmingham City. A 1–1 draw at home to Burton Albion was followed by two successive 2–0 defeats, one at home to Reading and another away to Aston Villa, giving The Owls just four points out of twelve in March and losing their five-point advantage over seventh placed Fulham.

April
A 1–1 draw away at Barnsley saw The Owls drop into seventh place for the first time in ten matches, although amends were quickly made with a 2–0 victory over already relegated local rivals Rotherham United, thanks to a brace from Steven Fletcher. This result was followed by four further victories for Sheffield Wednesday, 2–1 at home against Newcastle United, 1–0 at home against Cardiff City thanks to a late Fernando Forestieri header and two successive 2–1 victories, one away to Queens Park Rangers and another at home to Derby County, with Steven Fletcher scoring his fourth goal in as many games in the latter. Following the game against Derby County, Sheffield Wednesday were in fourth place in the league table, their highest position in the whole of the 2016–17 season. The Owls remained unbeaten in April, ending the month with a 1–0 away win at Ipswich Town, with the game's solitary goal coming from Owls midfielder Kieran Lee.

May
With The Owls' play off place confirmed, after the Ipswich game, a much changed starting line up was fielded in the 2–1 home loss to Fulham. At the end of the league season, Sheffield Wednesday finished in fourth place.

Players

Transfers in

Transfers out

Loans in

Loans out

Transfer summary

Spending

Summer:  £ 12,600,000

Winter:  £

Total:  £ 12,600,000

Income

Summer:  Unknown

Winter:  £

Total:  Unknown

Net Expenditure

Summer:  £ 12,600,000

Winter:  £

Total:  £ 12,600,000

New contracts

Débuts
Players making their first team Sheffield Wednesday début in a competitive match.

Competitions

Pre-season friendlies
Sheffield Wednesday played five friendly games as part of their pre-season.

Championship
Sheffield Wednesday will compete in the Football League Championship for the 2016–17 season.

League table

Results summary

Results by round

All fixtures are subject to change.

Matches

August

September

October

November

December

January

February

March

April

May

Play-offs
As a result of The Owls finishing in fourth place, they qualified for the play-offs for the second consecutive season. In the play-off semi finals, Sheffield Wednesday played against fifth-placed local rivals Huddersfield Town.

EFL Cup

Sheffield Wednesday competed in the 2016–17 EFL Cup for one round. They were eliminated 2–1 by Cambridge United.

FA Cup

Sheffield Wednesday entered the FA Cup in the third round, where they lost to Middlesbrough.

Overview

Goalscorers

Includes all competitive matches.

Disciplinary record

Clean sheets

Awards

Player of the Month
Player of the Month awards for the 2016–17 season.

EFL Team of the Week
Two Sheffield Wednesday players have been in the EFL Team of the Week during the 2016–17 season.

 Midfielder:  Kieran Lee (26 September 2016)
 Midfielder:  Sam Hutchinson (28 December 2016)

EFL Team of 2016
One Sheffield Wednesday player was in the EFL Team of 2016.

 Goalkeeper:  Keiren Westwood

League Managers Association Performance of the Week
Sheffield Wednesday won this award once during the 2016–17 season.

 EFL Championship: Newcastle United 0–1 Sheffield Wednesday (26 December 2016)

References

Sheffield Wednesday
Sheffield Wednesday F.C. seasons